Michael Fish is a television weatherman in the UK.

Michael Fish may also refer to:
Michael Fish (fashion designer), fashion designer prominent in the UK in the 1960s and 1970s
Michael Fish (architect) (born 1934), Canadian architect and urban conservationist
Mike Fish, Australian rugby league player